Craigmalloch is a small settlement in East Ayrshire, Scotland.

External links
Scotland's places
Royal Commission on Ancient and Historical Monuments of Scotland

Villages in East Ayrshire